Zachary "Zach" Bell (born November 14, 1982) is a Canadian former professional racing cyclist, who competed professionally between 2005 and 2015 for the Jet Fuel Coffee–Sympatico, Rite Aid Pro Cycling, and  teams. Born in Whitehorse, Yukon, Bell resides in Watson Lake, Yukon, and now works as a directeur sportif for UCI Women's Team .

Career
At the 2008 Summer Olympics, Bell finished 7th in the men's points race and 12th in the men's madison (cycling). He finished 2nd in the men's omnium at the 2012 UCI Track Cycling World Championships in Melbourne. Later that year, Bell finished 8th in the men's omnium at the 2012 Summer Olympics.

Major results

2003
 1st Stage 1 Tour de Delta
2004
 2nd Time trial, National Under-23 Road Championships
2005
 1st Stampede Road Race
2006
 1st Stage 7 Tour of Shenandoah
2007
 1st Overall Tour de Delta
1st Stages 1 & 2
 1st Burnaby Six Days
 Tour de Bowness
1st Criterium
1st Hill Climb
 Vuelta a El Salvador
1st Stages 4 & 7
 1st Stage 2 Tour de White Rock
 2nd Scratch, 2007–08 UCI Track Cycling World Cup Classics, Sydney
 2nd  Time trial, Pan American Road Championships
 National Road Championships
2nd Criterium
3rd Time trial
2008
 Pan American Road and Track Championships
1st  Madison
1st  Omnium
5th Time trial
 1st Burnaby Six Days
 3rd Time trial, National Road Championships
2009
 1st Overall Fitchburg Longsjo Classic
 2nd  Omnium, UCI Track Cycling World Championships
 3rd Time trial, National Road Championships
 6th Overall Tour of Thailand
2010
 2nd Time trial, National Road Championships
 Commonwealth Games
3rd  Scratch
7th Time trial
2011
 3rd Road race, National Road Championships
2012
 2nd  Omnium, UCI Track Cycling World Championships
2013
 National Road Championships
1st  Road race
3rd Time trial
 1st Stage 4 Tour de Taiwan
 1st Stage 6 Tour de Korea
2014
 1st Bucks County Classic
 3rd Winston-Salem Cycling Classic
2015
 8th Overall Vuelta a la Independencia Nacional

References

External links
 
 COC Profile
 
 

1982 births
Living people
Canadian male cyclists
Canadian track cyclists
Cyclists at the 2008 Summer Olympics
Cyclists at the 2012 Summer Olympics
Olympic cyclists of Canada
Sportspeople from Whitehorse
Cyclists at the 2010 Commonwealth Games
Cyclists at the 2014 Commonwealth Games
Commonwealth Games medallists in cycling
Commonwealth Games bronze medallists for Canada
Medallists at the 2010 Commonwealth Games